The Peninsula School District is the main school district for the city of Gig Harbor, Washington, USA and the unincorporated areas around Gig Harbor and the Key Peninsula. These areas include Artondale, Arletta, Rosedale, Purdy, Wollochet, Vaughn, Lakebay, Longbranch, Home, Wauna, Crescent Valley and the Kopachuck area.

High schools
 Gig Harbor High School
 Peninsula High School
 Henderson Bay Alternative High School

Middle schools
 Goodman Middle School – leads into Gig Harbor High School  Website
 Kopachuck Middle School – leads into Gig Harbor High  School Website
 Harbor Ridge Middle School – leads into Peninsula High School Website
 Key Peninsula Middle School – leads into Peninsula High School Website

Elementary schools
 Harbor Heights Elementary School – leads into Goodman Middle School
 Discovery Elementary School – leads into Goodman Middle School
 Voyager Elementary School – leads into Kopachuck Middle School
 Artondale Elementary School – lead into Kopachuck Middle School
 Evergreen Elementary School – leads into Key Peninsula Middle School
 Minter Creek Elementary School – leads into Key Peninsula Middle School
 Purdy Elementary School – leads into Harbor Ridge Middle School
 Vaughn Elementary School – leads into Key Peninsula Middle School

Superintendent
Robert Manahan was the superintendent of the Peninsula School District from July 2016 through 2018. Art Jarvis was the interim 
superintendent of the Peninsula School District from 2018 to 2020. As of July 2021, Krestin Bahr has served as superintendent.

Krestin Bahr previously worked at Tacoma Public Schools, where she served as the head of middle schools and as the Regional Director for Mt. Tahoma. Bahr was also the superintendent for Eatonville School District in 2013.

Board of Directors
Peninsula School District has 5 districts, and therefore 5 directors that serve the Gig Harbor area. The president of the board is Lori Glover of district 3, while the vice president is Natalie Wimberly. Other members include Chuck West, Jennifer Butler, and David Olsen. Many of the school board members are former military members, or former firefighters, in the case of West.

References

External links
 Official site

 
School districts in Washington (state)
Education in Pierce County, Washington
Gig Harbor, Washington